Giorgio Stassi (born 22 June 1965, in Palermo) is an Italian scientist.

Biography and his Works

The Graduation
He studied medicine at the University of Palermo and graduated in 1991. The same year, he was awarded the university prize with the special mention for the curriculum vitae and doctoral thesis. 
Following his approval as a specialist in Endocrinology in 1996.

The Post-Doctoral Work
He did his post-doctoral work at the Rangos Research Center, Pittsburgh (USA) until 1998.

The return in Italy
After his return to Italy, he became Group Leader of the Molecular and Cellular Biology Laboratory at the University of Palermo.
In October 10th 2003 he has his first daughter Costanza, also known as cocca.
In 2009, he was awarded the 'L’Altra Italia – Vite da Premio', a prize to honor Italian scientific researchers for outstanding achievements.
In 2010 years, he became a pioneer in isolating and characterizing human cancer stem cells from solid tumors and in elucidating their remarkable apoptosis resistance mediated by interleukins.
Professor Stassi was Director of the Cellular and Molecular Oncology Department at the S. Maugeri Foundation, IRCCS, in Pavia, Italy until June 2012.
He has recently identified the role of certain cytokines, most importantly of IL-4, to block apoptosis in cancer cells in an autocrine fashion, i.e. the tumor cell itself provides the apoptosis-inhibitory stimulus by production of IL-4.
They also described the importance of the neutralization of IL-4 in the sensitization of cancer cells and cancer stem cells to conventional chemotherapy.

Honors
Cover Issue in Science, 275: 1997
Cover Issue in Circulation, 98: 1998
Cover Issue in Blood, 93: 1999
Cover Issue in Circulation Research, 85: 1999
Cover Issue in FASEB Journal 18:2004.
Cover Issue in Gastroenterology 138: 2010

Patents
 Sensitizing cells for apoptosis by selectively blocking cytokines. US2006257401 – 2006-11-16.
 Method for the purification and amplification of tumoral stem cells. EP1805299 – 2007-07-11.
 Sensitizing cells for apoptosis by selectively blocking cytokines. EP1592449 – 2005-11-09.
 Antibody specific for Human IL-4 for Treatment of Cancer. WO2007107349 – 2007-09-27.

Research focus
 tumor sensitization by neutralizing IL-4,
 regulation of apoptosis by IL-4, 
 characterization and sensitization to chemotherapy of colon and breast cancer stem cells, 
 tumorigenic and metastatic properties of cancer stem cells, 
 evaluation of molecular targets involved in the survival and differentiation pathways of cancer stem cells in vitro and in vivo.

Professional Societies
American Association for Cancer Research (AACR), American Society of Clinical Oncology (ASCO)

Peer Reviewing
Reviewer for several journals including: Science, Nature Medicine, Journal of Experimental Medicine, Blood, PLoS Medicine, PLoS ONE, Molecular Medicine, Clinical Cancer Research, British Journal of Cancer, Cancer Research, Oncogene, Nature, Cell Death and Differentiation, Journal of Immunology, Journal Clinical Immunology, International Journal of Cancer, Molecular Cancer Research, Journal of Biological Chemistry, Journal of Endocrinological Investigation, Endocrinology, Journal of Endocrinology, Molecular Cancer Therapeutics, JBC, Journal of Cellular and Molecular Medicine.

Ad hoc reviewer for several grants agencies including: European Commission, Medical Research Council of UK, the Israel Science Foundation (ISF), Cancer Research UK. Funding for Scientific Research of Belgium, National Research Agency of France, National Cancer Institute of France, Italian Ministry of Universities and Research, Italian Ministry of Health, Italian National Institute of Health.

References

Scientists from Palermo
Italian oncologists
1965 births
Living people